Troponin C is a protein which is part of the troponin complex. It contains four calcium-binding EF hands, although different isoforms may have fewer than four functional calcium-binding subdomains. It is a component of thin filaments, along with actin and tropomyosin. It contains an N lobe and a C lobe.  The C lobe serves a structural purpose and binds to the N domain of troponin I (TnI).  The C lobe can bind either Ca2+ or Mg2+.  The N lobe, which binds only Ca2+, is the regulatory lobe and binds to the C domain of troponin I after calcium binding.

Isoforms 

The tissue specific subtypes are:
 Slow troponin C, TNNC1 (3p21.1 )
 Fast troponin C, TNNC2 (20q12-q13.11)

Mutations 
Point mutations can occur in troponin C inducing alterations to Ca2+ and Mg2+ binding and protein structure, leading to abnormalities in muscle contraction. In cardiac muscle, they are related to dilated cardiomyopathy (DCM) and hypertrophic cardiomyopathy (HCM).

These known point mutations are:

A8V
D145E
 A31S
 C84Y
 E134D
 Y5H
 I148V

See also 
 Troponin
 Troponin T
 Troponin I
 Calcium-binding protein
 Sliding filament model

References

External links 
 

Troponin